Full and Final is a 2013 Bangladeshi romantic action thriller film directed by Malek Afsary. The film stars Shakib Khan and Bobby in the lead roles. Full and Final is about a rough and tough police officer and released on 16 October 2013 of Eid Al Adha.  Upon release, the film received mixed reviews and was a Super-hit.

Plot
Rimjim is a painter, who looks after her grandfather's shop during the week and earns extra money as a street painter on weekends. It's through her painting that she meets Abith (Tanvir Khan), a cop who is chasing a criminal, but keeps Rimjim in the dark about his real work. The other man, Romeo (Shakib Khan), is an undercover police officer who found a soft spot for her and watches her from afar for some time.
However, being shy and ever mindful of the dangers of his professional career Romeo can only make small gestures to her while still staying in the shadows. Rimjim is dying to meet the man who leaves flowers on her doorstep every day, and built a bridge over a stream for her after she once fell in. Both men try to woo her from afar while still hiding their identities, as she remains alone but moved by these incredible gestures to her. It's only a matter of time before the undercover police officer and Interpol agent cross paths and things really begin to unravel in this action-fueled romance story.

Cast
 Shakib Khan as IPS Romeo
 Bobby as Rimjim
 Amit Hasan as Boktiar
 Tanvir Khan as Abid
 Ilias Kobra as Ilias
 Shiba Shanu as Drug Dealer
 Don as Drug Dealer
 Kabila as Kabila

Music
The soundtrack for the film is composed by Ali Akram Shuvo and Ahmed Humayun, with the lyrics penned by Kabir Bakul and Sudip Kumar Dip.

References

External links
 Full and Final at Bangladesh Movie Database

2013 films
Bengali-language Bangladeshi films
2013 action thriller films
Films scored by Ali Akram Shuvo
Films scored by Ahmed Humayun
Films directed by Malek Afsari
Bangladeshi remakes of foreign films
2010s Bengali-language films